Fingernails is an upcoming science fiction romance film directed and co-written by Christos Nikou.

Premise
A woman begins working at an institute that works to determine if the romance in a given couple is genuine.

Cast
 Jessie Buckley as Anna
 Riz Ahmed as Amir
 Jeremy Allen White as Ryan
 Luke Wilson
 Annie Murphy

Production
The film was announced in January 2021, with Carey Mulligan starring in the film and Christos Nikou directing, marking his English language debut. Mulligan joined the project upon watching and being impressed by Nikou's previous film Apples. No further developments would be announced until May 2022, when Jessie Buckley and Riz Ahmed were cast in the film, with Buckley replacing Mulligan. Apple Studios would also acquire the rights to the film that same month. In September, Jeremy Allen White joined the cast. Luke Wilson and Annie Murphy would be added to the cast in December.

Principal photography commenced in Toronto and Hamilton, Ontario at the end of October 2022 and wrapped that December.

References

External links
 

Upcoming films
Apple TV+ original films
American science fiction romance films
Films shot in Toronto